The 2018 Munster Senior Hurling Championship was the 2018 installment of the annual Munster Senior Hurling Championship organised by Munster GAA.

This was the first year of a new format.

Cork won a second consecutive title by defeating Clare in the final.

Format
A new provincial hurling championship featuring five-team round-robin groups in both Leinster and Munster and the new Joe McDonagh Cup was introduced in 2018 for an initial three-year period. The proposal was carried by a narrow margin with 62% voting in favour (a majority of at least 60% was required) at the GAA's Special Congress on 30 September 2017. The top two teams in each provincial group would contest the provincial final, with the provincial winners advancing to the All-Ireland semi-finals and the losing provincial finalists advancing to the two quarter-finals.	

An amendment to the motion from Laois, Offaly and Meath was carried by 87%. The third-placed teams in Leinster and Munster would compete in All-Ireland preliminary quarter-finals against the two Joe McDonagh Cup finalists, with the Joe McDonagh Cup teams having home advantage.

If a non-Munster team were to win the Joe McDonagh Cup, the bottom team in the Leinster championship would be relegated to the following year's Joe McDonagh Cup and would be replaced in the following year's Leinster championship by the Joe McDonagh Cup winners. If a Munster team were to win the Joe McDonagh Cup, they would play off against the team who finished bottom in the Munster championship for the right to play in the following year's Munster championship, thereby ensuring that only Munster teams compete in the Munster championship.

The restructure of hurling involved the reduction of the Leinster championship from nine teams to five while the Munster championship continued with the previous five Munster teams (Kerry previously competed in the qualifier group of the Leinster championship). A six-team Joe McDonagh Cup was created, consisting of all four teams from the 2017 Leinster qualifier group plus Antrim and Carlow, the 2017 Christy Ring Cup finalists.

Teams
The Munster championship was contested by five of the six counties from the Irish province of Munster. The exception was Kerry, traditionally the province's weakest at hurling (but strongest in football).

Personnel and colours

Group table
{| class="wikitable" style="text-align:center"
!width=20|
!width=150 style="text-align:left;"|Team
!width=20|
!width=20|
!width=20|
!width=20|
!width=30|
!width=30|
!width=20|
!width=20|
|- style="background:#ccffcc"
|1||align=left| Cork ||4||2||2||0||5-94 (109)||4-89 (101)||+8||6
|- style="background:#ccffcc" 
|2||align=left| Clare ||4||3||0||1||4-97 (109)||5-77 (92)||+17||6
|-style="background:#FFFFE0"
|3||align=left| Limerick ||4||2||1||1||3-92 (101)||4-81 (93)||+8||5
|- 
|4||align=left| Tipperary ||4||0||2||2||7-77 (98)||5-91 (106)||–8||2
|-   
|5||align=left| Waterford ||4||0||1||3||6-76 (94)||7-98 (119)||–25||1
|-|align=left|
|colspan="10" style="border:0px"| Green background The top two teams contested the Munster Final, with the winners advancing to the All-Ireland semi-finals and the losers advancing to the All-Ireland quarter-finals.Yellow background The third-placed team advanced to the All-Ireland preliminary quarter-finals. As the 2018 Joe McDonagh Cup was won by Carlow (a Leinster county), there was no relegation/promotion play-off between the bottom team in the Munster group and the Joe McDonagh Cup winners for the right to compete in next year's Munster championship.Cork are ranked ahead of Clare as they won the head-to-head game between the teams.
|}

Group matches

Round 1

Round 2

Round 3

Round 4

Round 5

Final
The winning team advanced to the All-Ireland semi-finals, while the losing team advanced to the All-Ireland quarter-finals.

See also
 2018 All-Ireland Senior Hurling Championship
 2018 Leinster Senior Hurling Championship
 2018 Joe McDonagh Cup

References

Munster
Munster Senior Hurling Championship